Associazione Sportiva Racing Sporting Club Nuoto Roma or simply Racing Roma is a water polo club based in Rome.

Racing Roma founded in 1976 by brothers Schembri, has participated in several professional leagues until 2008, when the men's water polo section merged with that of the S.S. Roma creating A.S. Roma Pallanuoto. In the season 2010- 2011 women's team plays in the Serie A2, the second division of the Italian league.

Honours 

men

LEN Cup Winners' Cup
 Winners (1): 1995-96
 Runners-up (1): 1996-97
LEN Euro Cup
 Winners (1): 1993-94
LEN Super Cup
 Runners-up (1): 1996

women

Women's LEN Trophy
 Winners (2): 2006–07, 2007–08

External links 
 Official site

Notes 

Water polo clubs in Italy